Mockingbirds are a group of New World passerine birds from the family Mimidae. They are best known for the habit of some species mimicking the songs of other birds and the sounds of insects and amphibians, often loudly and in rapid succession. There are about 17 species in two genera, although three species of mockingbird from the Galapagos Islands were formerly separated into a third genus, Nesomimus. The mockingbirds do not appear to form a monophyletic lineage, as Mimus and Melanotis are not each other's closest relatives; instead, Melanotis appears to be more closely related to the catbirds, while the closest living relatives of Mimus appear to be thrashers, such as the sage thrasher.

The only mockingbird commonly found in North America is the northern mockingbird (Mimus polyglottos). The Greek word  means 'multiple languages'. Mockingbirds are known for singing late at night, even past midnight.

Species in taxonomic order
Mimus:
 Brown-backed mockingbird, Mimus dorsalis
 Bahama mockingbird, Mimus gundlachii
 Long-tailed mockingbird, Mimus longicaudatus
 Patagonian mockingbird, Mimus patagonicus
 Chilean mockingbird, Mimus thenca
 White-banded mockingbird, Mimus triurus
 Northern mockingbird, Mimus polyglottos
 Socorro mockingbird, Mimus graysoni
 Tropical mockingbird, Mimus gilvus
 Chalk-browed mockingbird, Mimus saturninus
Formerly Nesomimus (endemic to the Galapagos):
 Hood mockingbird, Mimus macdonaldi
 Galápagos mockingbird, Mimus parvulus
 Floreana mockingbird or Charles mockingbird, Mimus trifasciatus
 San Cristóbal mockingbird, Mimus melanotis
Melanotis:
 Blue mockingbird, Melanotis caerulescens
 Blue-and-white mockingbird, Melanotis hypoleucus

Charles Darwin

When the survey voyage of HMS Beagle visited the Galápagos Islands in September to October 1835, the naturalist Charles Darwin noticed that the mockingbirds Mimus thenca differed from island to island, and were closely allied in appearance to mockingbirds on the South American mainland. Nearly a year later when writing up his notes on the return voyage he speculated that this, together with what he had been told about Galápagos tortoises, could undermine the doctrine of stability of species. This was his first recorded expression of his doubts about species being immutable, which led to his being convinced about the transmutation of species and hence evolution.

References

External links
 Mockingbird videos, photographs and sound recordings  on the Internet Bird Collection

 Mockingbird singing 

Mimidae
Symbols of Mississippi
Bird common names